is a  video game for the Sega 32X released in 1995. It was developed by Sega and Red Company and published by Sega.

Story
In Tempo, the titular character Tempo and his friend, Katy, star on the Major Minor Show as they climb the top of the tower to defeat King Dirge.

Gameplay
The stages are presented as performances on a musical variety show like Soul Train.  The game uses hand-drawn graphics for the backgrounds and sprites.

Reception
On release, Famicom Tsūshin scored the game a 30 out of 40. Though they commented on the lack of originality in the gameplay, GamePro concluded that Tempo'''s "dazzling" background graphics, rich soundtrack, and extremely low difficulty make it "a perfect game for novices."

In GameFan magazine, Dave Halverson, Nick Rox and K. Lee rated the game 79, 80, and 88, respectively.Next Generation reviewed the game, rating it two stars out of five, and stated that "none of [its] good qualities keep Tempo from missing the beat and being yet another poor 32X effort."

Four reviewers for the Japanese Sega Saturn Magazine gave it scores of 6,4,6,7, for an average of 6.25.

In a retrospective review, IGN gave the game 7 out of 10.

Sequels
In part because it was released on the failed 32X add-on, it failed to find an audience. Sega tried again with two more games: a spinoff titled Tempo Jr. in 1995 for the Game Gear, and a sequel titled Super Tempo in 1998 for the Sega Saturn.Famicom Tsūshin scored Tempo Jr.'' an 18 out of 40.

Notes

References

1995 video games
Red Entertainment games
Sega video games
Sega 32X games
Platform games
Sega 32X-only games
Video games developed in Japan